Hectobrocha is a genus of moths in the subfamily Arctiinae. The genus was erected by Edward Meyrick in 1886.

Species
 Hectobrocha adoxa (Meyrick, 1886)
 Hectobrocha multilinea T. P. Lucas, 1890
 Hectobrocha pentacyma Meyrick, 1886
 Hectobrocha subnigra T. P. Lucas, 1890

References

Lithosiini
Moth genera